Solapur City Central Assembly constituency (249) is one of the 288 Vidhan Sabha (legislative assembly) constituencies of Maharashtra state, western India. This constituency is located in Solapur district, of which Solapur city is the district headquarters, and is part of Solapur (Lok Sabha constituency).

Geographical scope
The constituency comprises ward nos.6, 29 to 39, 44 to 47, 50, 51, 66 to 85, 89 & 90 belong to Solapur Municipal Corporation lying in Solapur North taluka.

Before 2009, the Solapur City Central Assembly Constituency did not exist, instead North Solapur Assembly Constituency and Solapur City South Assembly Constituency were there.

Vidhan Sabha Members

Election Results

Vidhan Sabha elections, 2019

Vidhan Sabha elections, 2014

Vidhan Sabha elections, 2009
 Praniti Shinde (Congress) : 68,028 votes   
 Adam Narasayya Narayan (CPM) : 34,664
 Purushottam Dattatray Barde  (Shiv Sena) :  26,562

See also

 Solapur City North Assembly constituency

 Solapur South Assembly constituency

 Solapur North Assembly constituency

 Solapur City South Assembly Constituency

References

Assembly constituencies of Solapur district
Solapur
Assembly constituencies of Maharashtra